In HTML , XHTML and MediaWiki, the blockquote element defines "a section [within a document] that is quoted from another source". The syntax is 

<blockquote><p>blockquoted text goes here</p></blockquote>.

The blockquote element is used to indicate the quotation of a large section of text from another source.  Using the default HTML styling of most web browsers, it will indent the right and left margins both on the display and in printed form, but this may be overridden by Cascading Style Sheets (CSS).

The non-semantic use of the blockquote element purely to indent text has been deprecated by the W3C (World Wide Web Consortium) since HTML 4.  The preferred approach is the use of CSS.

Usage
Related HTML elements include the <q> and <cite> tags for shorter, probably in-line, quotations and for citations respectively.  An HTML attribute specific to the <blockquote> and <q> tags is cite= where the provenance of the material quoted may be given.  If the quotation is in a language other than that of the main document, lang= and maybe dir= attributes may be relevant to specify the language of the quoted text and perhaps its direction, left-to-right or right-to-left. class= may be used for semantic or styling purposes.

Relationship to some wiki markup and usage
In many Wiki markup languages, the semantics and effect of HTML <blockquote> is different from the use of an initial colon in a paragraph, which may be translated into an HTML dd element enclosed within a dl element.  (That is a "data definition" within a "definition list", without there being any preceding "data term" or dt element).

See also 
 Block quotation

References

External links 
W3C
MDN
W3Schools

HTML tags
Quotations